Winston Smith may refer to:

People 
 Winston Smith (artist) (born 1952), American artist
 Winston Smith (athlete) (born 1982), Olympic track and field athlete
 Winston Boogie Smith (born ), American man killed by law enforcement in 2021
 Winston Smith, a co-host of The Political Cesspool

Fictional people 
Winston Smith (Nineteen Eighty-Four), protagonist in George Orwell's novel Nineteen Eighty-Four.
Winston Smith (Tomb Raider), fictional butler in a video game series

Other 
 Winston Smith Project, human rights movement